Fedotovia is a genus of Asian ground spiders that was first described by Dmitry Kharitonov in 1946.

Species
 it contains four species:
Fedotovia feti Fomichev & Marusik, 2015 – Mongolia
Fedotovia mikhailovi Fomichev & Marusik, 2015 – Mongolia
Fedotovia mongolica Marusik, 1993 – Mongolia
Fedotovia uzbekistanica Charitonov, 1946 (type) – Central Asia, Iran, Afghanistan

References

Araneomorphae genera
Gnaphosidae
Spiders of Asia
Taxa named by Dmitry Kharitonov